Blossom Hill is a summit in Rome, Georgia. It is considered to be one of the Seven Hills of Rome, Georgia.

Blossom Hill was named from the fact a local girl picked flowers there. In 1939, the Bruce Hamler Water Treatment Plant, named for a former city manager, was constructed on the hill in 1939.

References

Mountains of Floyd County, Georgia
Mountains of Georgia (U.S. state)